Malovodnoye is an ethnically Kazakh village in Almaty Region of south-eastern Kazakhstan. It is located in the Enbekshikazakh District, approximately 75 kilometres north-east of Almaty and midway between the larger settlements of Yevgenyevka and Yanaturmysh. Numerous clashes between Kazakhs and ethnic Chechens have broken out in the village, notably in March-April 2007.

Demographics
Most locals are ethnic Kazakhs
Chechens settlers
Turkish immigrants
Chinese immigrants

Notes

Populated places in Almaty Region